was a Japanese actress active from 1948 to 1963. She appeared mostly in films of the Shochiku film studios, often under the direction of Keisuke Kinoshita.

Selected filmography
1948: The Portrait (肖像 Shōzō) – dir. Keisuke Kinoshita
1948: Apostasy (破戒 Hakai) – dir. Keisuke Kinoshita
1949: Late Spring (晩春 Banshun) – dir. Yasujirō Ozu
1949: Broken Drum (破れ太鼓 Yabure-daiko) – dir. Keisuke Kinoshita
1950: Scandal (醜聞 Shubun) – dir. Akira Kurosawa
1950: Battle of Roses (薔薇合戦 Bara gassen) – dir. Mikio Naruse
1951: The Good Fairy (善魔 Zenma) – dir. Keisuke Kinoshita
1951: Fireworks Over the Sea (海の花火 Umi no hanabi) – dir. Keisuke Kinoshita
1952: Nami (波) – dir. Noboru Nakamura
1953: Adventure of Natsuko (夏子の冒険 Natsuko no boken) – dir. Noboru Nakamura
1953: Jinanbō (次男坊) – dir. Yoshitarō Nomura
1953: A Japanese Tragedy (日本の悲劇 Nihon no higeki) – dir. Keisuke Kinoshita
1954: Shinjitsu ichiro (真実一路) – dir. Yūzō Kawashima
1955: The Tattered Wings (遠い雲 Tōi kumo) – dir. Keisuke Kinoshita
1956: Fountainhead (泉 Izumi) – dir. Masaki Kobayashi
1956: Trouble about a Typhoon (台風騒動記 Taifū sōdōki) – dir. Satsuo Yamamoto
1957: Times of Joy and Sorrow (喜びも悲しみも幾歳月 Yorokobi mo kanashami mo ikutoshitsuki) – dir. Keisuke Kinoshita
1958: Undutiful Street (親不幸通り Oya fukō dōri) – dir. Yasuzō Masumura
1958: Four Seasons of Love (四季の愛欲 Shiki no aiyoku) – dir. Kō Nakahira
1959: The Assignation (密会 Mikkai) – dir. Kō Nakahira
1960: White Fangs (白い牙 Shiroi kiba) – dir. Heinosuke Gosho

References

External links

1930 births
2007 deaths
20th-century Japanese actresses
Japanese film actresses
People from Tokyo